In molecular biology, SNORA26 is a member of the H/ACA class of small nucleolar RNA that guide the sites of modification of uridines to pseudouridines.

The snoRNA HBI-6 belong to the H/ACA family of snoRNAs, guiding the pseudouridylation of position U4522 of the 28S rRNA. HBI-6 is the human orthologue of mouse MBI-6 snoRNA.

References

External links 
 

Small nuclear RNA